Abner González Rivera (born 9 October 2000) is a Puerto Rican cyclist, who currently rides for UCI WorldTeam .

Major results
2017
 3rd Overall Vuelta al Besaya
1st Stage 4
2019
 National Road Championships
1st  Road race
1st  Under-23 road race
 2nd  Time trial, Caribbean Road Championships
2020
 1st Clásica Ciudad de Torredonjimeno
2021
 National Road Championships
1st  Road race
1st  Time trial
 4th Circuito de Getxo
 5th Vuelta a Castilla y León
 6th Overall Volta a Portugal
1st  Young rider classification
2022
 National Road Championships
1st  Road race
2nd Time trial

References

External links

2000 births
Living people
People from Moca, Puerto Rico
Puerto Rican male cyclists